Lønavatnet is a lake in the municipality of Voss in Vestland county, Norway. The  lake lies along the river Strandaelvi which runs from Vinje south to Vossevangen.

See also
List of lakes in Norway

References

Voss
Lakes of Vestland